Naghma Mushtaq Lang (born 1968) is a Pakistani politician and Ex-Minister Punjab who had been a member of the Provincial Assembly of the Punjab from August 2018 till January 2023. Previously, she was a member of the Punjab Assembly from 2008 to 2010 and again from May 2013 to May 2018.

Early life 
Lang was born in 1968. She is the wife of a former member Provincial Assembly of the Punjab and former Tehsil Nazim of Jalalpur Pirwala Malik Mushtaq Ahmed Lang.

Political career
Naghma Mushtaq Lang was elected to the Provincial Assembly of the Punjab as a candidate of Pakistan Muslim League (Q) (PML-Q) from Constituency PP-206 (Multan-XIII) in 2008 Pakistani general election. She received 28,109 votes and defeated a candidate of Pakistan Peoples Party (PPP). She resigned from her Punjab Assembly seat in April 2010 after her graduation degree was challenged.

She was re-elected to the Provincial Assembly of the Punjab  as a candidate of Pakistan Muslim League (N) (PML-N) from Constituency PP-206 (Multan-XIII) in 2013 Pakistani general election. She received 43,228 votes and defeated Malik Muhammad Akram Kahnu, a candidate of PPP.

In December 2013, she was appointed as Parliamentary Secretary for population welfare.

In November 2016, she was inducted into the provincial Punjab cabinet of Chief Minister Shehbaz Sharif and was made Provincial Minister of Punjab for Zakat and Ushr.

She was re-elected to Provincial Assembly of the Punjab as a candidate of PML-N from Constituency PP-223 (Multan-XIII) in 2018 Pakistani general election.

References

Living people
Women members of the Provincial Assembly of the Punjab
Punjab MPAs 2013–2018
Punjab MPAs 2008–2013
1968 births
Pakistan Muslim League (N) MPAs (Punjab)
Punjab MPAs 2018–2023
Women provincial ministers of Punjab
21st-century Pakistani women politicians